PS America was a paddle wheel steamship of the White Star Line, built in 1891. Together with her sister ship , she tendered the various White Star Liners which stopped to embark passengers at Queenstown, Ireland (now Cobh). 

America embarked 123 passengers onto Titanic (three First-Class, seven Second-Class and one hundred-thirteen Third-Class). The Titanic sank on 15 April 1912 after colliding with an iceberg, partway through her maiden voyage. Following the sinking of the Titanic, America and Ireland's  White Star Line flags were raised half-mast on 19 April 1912.

America was broken up on 11 December 1945, then under the name Seamore.

References

1891 ships